Water View is an unincorporated community in Middlesex County, Virginia, United States. Water View had a post office, which closed on March 8, 2008.

References

Unincorporated communities in Middlesex County, Virginia
Unincorporated communities in Virginia